Hagman is a Swedish surname. Notable people with the surname include:

 Carl Hagman (1890–1949), Swedish actor
 Emy Hagman (1906–1976), Swedish actress
Itai Hagman, Argentine politician
Justus Hagman, Swedish actor
Larry Hagman, American actor
Matti Hagman, Finnish ice hockey player
Mia Hagman, Finnish breaststroke swimmer
Nathalie Hagman, Swedish handball player
Niklas Hagman, Finnish ice hockey player, son of Matti
Sofia Hagman, Finnish educator
Sophie Hagman, Swedish ballet dancer

Fictional
Daniel Hagman, a character in the Sharpe novel series

See also
Hagmann

Swedish-language surnames